Louis Taylor (born May 12, 1979) is an American mixed martial artist currently competing in the welterweight division of the Professional Fighters League. A professional competitor since 2007, Taylor has also formerly competed for Strikeforce and Bellator. He is the first PFL Middleweight Tournament champion.

Background
Born and raised in the heart of Chicago's South Side, Taylor learned to defend himself from a young age. After being arrested at around age 16 for fighting a group of four gang members attacking him (and breaking an assailant's collarbone), Taylor was introduced to a high school wrestling coach and former Olympic alternate Ken Binge, by his pastor. Taylor, a sophomore at the time, later moved in with an uncle so that he could attend the school and compete. Highly talented, Taylor was a two-time state qualifier, and became the first competitor from a Chicago public school to compete in the state tournament. He later went on to wrestle for Lassen Community College in Susanville, California. At-then junior college powerhouse Lassen, Taylor was introduced to MMA and wrestled for two seasons before transferring to Eastern Illinois University. Competing at 174 lbs. under legendary former UFC champion and EIU coach Matt Hughes, Taylor excelled. Later, Taylor returned to Chicago to coach his former high school team, before transitioning to MMA at the age of 28.

Mixed martial arts career

Early career
Taylor had three amateur fights before making his professional debut in 2007 as a Light Heavyweight. Taylor compiled a record of 4-0 before debuting for Strikeforce.

The Ultimate Fighter
Taylor was at the tryouts for The Ultimate Fighter 13 on November 4, 2010. He did not make the final cast to get onto the show which debuted on March 30, 2011.

Strikeforce
Taylor made his Strikeforce debut at Strikeforce: Fedor vs. Rogers on November 7, 2009 against Nate Moore and was defeated via submission due to punches in the second round.

He would make his next appearance for the promotion in the main event of Strikeforce Challengers: Riggs vs. Taylor on August 13, 2010 against former WEC Welterweight Champion Joe Riggs and was defeated via submission due to punches in the third round.

Combat USA
Taylor fought Jason Louck on May 14, 2011 to determine the Middleweight Combat USA State Champion of Illinois. Taylor won the fight by submission (strikes) and was then supposed to face the Middleweight Combat USA State Champion of Wisconsin, Herbert Goodman. Unfortunately, Taylor Combat USA would not release Taylor from his contract.

Bellator Fighting Championships
Taylor first fought for Bellator at Bellator 14 on April 15, 2010 and won by KO due to a head kick in the first round over Ryan Sturdy.

Taylor fought for the promotion again on December 14, 2012 at Bellator 84 against UFC veteran Joe Vedepo. Taylor defeated Vedepo via first-round knockout.

Ultimate Fighting Championship
After an injury forced Costas Philippou out of his bout with Uriah Hall, it was announced on January 2, 2015, that Taylor had signed on to face Hall on short notice at UFC Fight Night: McGregor vs. Siver on January 18, 2015. However, on January 11, it was announced that Taylor pulled out of the fight due to a pulled muscle in his back and had his contract terminated as result.

World Series of Fighting
On March 12, 2016, Taylor made his World Series of Fighting debut at WSOF 29 against Cory Devela. He won via guillotine choke submission in 29 seconds of the first round.

On July 30, 2016, Taylor faced undefeated fighter Phil Hawes at WSOF 32. He won via guillotine choke submission in the second round.

Professional Fighters League
Taylor faced Anderson Goncalves at PFL 3 in Washington D.C. on July 5, 2018. He won the fight via TKO in the third round.

In the fall of 2018, Taylor entered the PFL Middleweight tournament. At PFL 10 on October 20, 2018, he defeated Rex Harris by unanimous decision in the quarterfinal round. He then fought John Howard to a technical draw in the semifinal round; Taylor advanced to the finals by having won the first round. Taylor faced Abuspiyan Magomedov in the finals at PFL 11 on December 31, 2018. He won the fight via knockout just 33 seconds into the first round, winning the PFL Middleweight Championship and earning the $1 million cash prize.

For the second season of PFL, Taylor was expected to drop down to welterweight and face Chris Curtis on May 9, 2019. However just a week before the second season's start, Taylor announced that he had withdrawn from the tournament.

Personal life
Taylor is married and has children.

Championships and accomplishments
World Series of Fighting
Fastest Submission in WSOF History (0:29) vs. Cory Devela
Professional Fighters League
2018 Middleweight Tournament champion

Mixed martial arts record

|-
|Win
|align=center|18–4–1
|Abusupiyan Magomedov
|KO (punch)
|PFL 11
|
|align=center|1
|align=center|0:33
|New York City, New York, United States 
|
|- 
|Draw
|align=center|17–4–1
|John Howard
|Technical Draw (illegal knee)
| rowspan=2 |PFL 10
| rowspan=2 |
|align=center|2
|align=center|4:55
| rowspan=2 |Washington, D.C., United States
|
|- 
|Win
|align=center| 17–4
|Rex Harris
|Decision (unanimous)
|align=center|2
|align=center|5:00
|
|-
|Win
| align=center| 16–4
|Andre Lobato
|Decision (unanimous)
|PFL 6 
|
|align=center|3
|align=center|5:00
|Atlantic City, New Jersey, United States
| 
|-
| Win
| align=center| 15–4
| Anderson Goncalves
| TKO (punches)
| PFL 3
| 
| align=center| 3
| align=center| 0:58
| Washington D.C., United States
| 
|-
| Win
| align=center| 14–4
| Zach Conn
| Decision (unanimous)
| PFL: Everett
| 
| align=center| 3
| align=center| 5:00
| Everett, Washington, United States
| 
|-
|Loss
|align=center|13–4
|David Branch
|Submission (rear-naked choke)
|WSOF 34
|
|align=center|5
|align=center|2:00
|New York City, New York, United States
|
|-
| Win
| align=center| 13–3
| Phil Hawes
| Submission (guillotine choke)
| WSOF 32
| 
| align=center| 2
| align=center| 2:15
| Everett, Washington, United States
| 
|-
| Win
| align=center| 12–3
| Cory Devela
| Technical Submission (guillotine choke)
| WSOF 29
| 
| align=center| 1
| align=center| 0:29
| Greeley, Colorado, United States
| 
|-
| Win
| align=center| 11–3
| Brian Houston
| Submission (guillotine choke)
| APFC 17
| 
| align=center| 1
| align=center| 2:14
| Hoffman Estates, Illinois, United States
| 
|-
| Win
| align=center| 10–3
| Robert Gotreau
| Submission (guillotine choke)
| APFC 16
| 
| align=center| 1
| align=center| 2:06
| Villa Park, Illinois, United States
| 
|-
| Win
| align=center| 9–3
| Eric Hammerich
| Submission (guillotine choke)
| APFC 11: Champion vs. Champion
| 
| align=center| 1
| align=center| 3:54
| McCook, Illinois, United States
| 
|-
| Win
| align=center| 8–3
| Joe Vedepo
| KO (punch)
| Bellator 84
| 
| align=center| 1
| align=center| 4:12
| Hammond, Indiana, United States
| 
|-
| Loss
| align=center| 7–3
| Perry Filkins
| TKO (punches)
| CZ 40: Kicking It XL at The Rock
| 
| align=center| 1
| align=center| 4:02
| Salem, New Hampshire, United States
| 
|-
| Win
| align=center| 7–2
| Jason Louck
| TKO (submission to strikes)
| Combat USA: Illinois State Finals
| 
| align=center| 2
| align=center| 4:40
| Racine, Wisconsin, United States
| 
|-
| Loss
| align=center| 6–2
| Joe Riggs
| TKO (submission to strikes)
| Strikeforce Challengers: Riggs vs. Taylor
| 
| align=center| 3
| align=center| 2:07
| Phoenix, Arizona, United States
| 
|-
| Win
| align=center| 6–1
| Ryan Sturdy
| KO (head kick)
| Bellator 14
| 
| align=center| 1
| align=center| 1:08
| Chicago, Illinois, United States
| 
|-
| Win
| align=center| 5–1
| Curtis Bailey
| TKO (punches)
| Hoosier FC 2: It's On
| 
| align=center| 1
| align=center| 0:33
| Hammond, Indiana, United States
| 
|-
| Loss
| align=center| 4–1
| Nate Moore
| TKO (submission to punches)
| Strikeforce: Fedor vs. Rogers
| 
| align=center| 2
| align=center| 3:24
| Hoffman Estates, Illinois, United States
| 
|-
| Win
| align=center| 4–0
| Steve Paterson
| KO (punches)
| TFC 14: Hornbuckle vs. Alexander
| 
| align=center| 1
| align=center| 4:34
| Hammond, Indiana, United States
| 
|-
| Win
| align=center| 3–0
| Adam Maciejewski
| Decision (unanimous)
| Adrenaline MMA: Guida vs. Russow
| 
| align=center| 3
| align=center| 5:00
| Chicago, Illinois, United States
| 
|-
| Win
| align=center| 2–0
| Aaron Kreke
| TKO (slam)
| C3: Corral Combat Classic 2
| 
| align=center| 2
| align=center| 0:40
| Hammond, Indiana, United States
| 
|-
| Win
| align=center| 1–0
| Ricco Talamantes
| Submission (guillotine choke)
| ISCF: Fight 2 the Finish
| 
| align=center| 1
| align=center| 4:30
| Chicago, Illinois, United States
|

See also
 List of current PFL fighters

References

External links
 
 
 Louis Taylor on MMAviewers.com
 

1979 births
Living people
American male mixed martial artists
Middleweight mixed martial artists
Mixed martial artists utilizing collegiate wrestling
Mixed martial artists utilizing Brazilian jiu-jitsu
Sportspeople from Chicago
Mixed martial artists from Illinois
African-American mixed martial artists
American male sport wrestlers
Amateur wrestlers
American practitioners of Brazilian jiu-jitsu
21st-century African-American sportspeople
20th-century African-American sportspeople